Aealo is the tenth full-length album by Greek extreme metal band Rotting Christ. It was released on 15 February 2010 via Season of Mist.

Vocalist Sakis Tolis stated that "AEALO is the transcription of the Ancient Greek word 'ΕΑΛΩ' into the Latin alphabet. It means thrashing, catastrophe or destruction, and reflects the musical and lyrical content of the album".

Track listing

 Track 3's name is transliterated as "Daimóno̱n vró̱sis"

Personnel
Rotting Christ
Sakis Tolis – vocals, guitars, keyboards
Giorgos Bokos – guitars
Andreas Lagios – bass
Themis Tolis – drums

Additional personnel
Magus Wampyr Daoloth (Necromantia) – vocals
A.A. Nemtheanga (Primordial) – vocals
Diamanda Galás – vocals ("Orders from the Dead")
Pleiades (the traditional choir from Epirus)
Daemonia Nymphe
Dirty Granny Tales
Androniki
Akis – tsampouna

Production
Rotting Christ – arrangement
Sakis Tolis – production, engineering (keyboards), mixing
Dimitrios Ntouvras – engineering (vocals and all other instruments), mixing, mastering

References

Rotting Christ albums
2010 albums
Season of Mist albums